The Moss Islands are a group of small islands and rocks lying east of Midas Island and north of Apéndice Island in Hughes Bay, off the west coast of Graham Land, Antarctica.  They were first charted in detail and given the descriptive name "Moos Inseln" (Moss Islands) by the Swedish Antarctic Expedition under Otto Nordenskiöld in 1902.

The islands form part of the Cierva Point and offshore islands Important Bird Area and ASPA 134.

See also 
 List of Antarctic and sub-Antarctic islands

References

Islands of Graham Land
Danco Coast
Important Bird Areas of Antarctica
Antarctic Specially Protected Areas